Beadles is a surname. Notable people with the surname include:

 Elisha Beadles (1670–1734), Welsh Quaker, writer, and translator
 Harry Beadles (1897–1958), Welsh footballer
 Zane Beadles (born 1986), American football player

See also
 Beadle (disambiguation)